USS Sentry may refer to the following ships of the United States Navy:

United States Navy ship names